Piaractus mesopotamicus, the small-scaled pacu, Paraná River pacu or simply pacu (a name shared with other species), is a South American ray-finned fish that is native to the Paraguay-Paraná River basin, but it has been introduced by aquaculture activities in a wider area. In its native range it is also known as the pacú chato, pez chato ("flat fish") or mbiraí-piraí.

Piaractus mesopotamicus is a robust fish, with ovoid shape, flattened laterally. Its colour is dark grey to silver, with a white belly and a yellow breast. The other member of its genus, P. brachypomus, can be distinguished by its larger scale-size and the lower number of lateral scales (less than 110).

Piaractus mesopotamicus is an omnivore. Young individuals usually feed on micro-crustaceans, while adults feed on plant material and insects. Main food items for adults are nuts and seeds that fall from trees in flooded forests.

References

 El Pato Web: Especies del Paraná (in Spanish)

Serrasalmidae
Fish of South America
Paraná River
Fish described in 1887
Taxa named by Eduardo Ladislao Holmberg